Urtica lalibertadensis is a species of the genus Urtica.  It differs from U. leptostachya in its subscandent habit and the deflexed stinging hairs on the glabrous stem, and by the presence of numerous stinging hairs on the perigon of the female flowers (and fruits) and individual stinging hairs on the perigon of the male flower. It is a very abundant species in Peru.

Description
Its inflorescences are androgynous, the lowest ones often pure male, upper one often pure female.

Distribution
La Libertad and Ancash. Its distribution area includes the region where U. urentivelutina is found.

References

External links

NGBR Herbarium Specimen

lalibertadensis
Flora of Peru